Gaston de Montheau, full name Guy Joseph Gaston de Montheau, (19 January 1828 – 16 February 1867) was a 19th-century French playwright and poet.

His plays were presented on the most significant Parisian stages of the 19th century including the Théâtre des Variétés, Théâtre de la Gaîté, Théâtre du Vaudeville, Théâtre-Français.

Works 
 Passe-temps de duchesse, comedy in 1 act, in prose
1851: La Course au plaisir, revue of the year 1851, in 2 acts and 3 tableaux, with Michel Delaporte and Théodore Muret
1851: Mignon, comedy in 2 acts, mingled with song
1851: Les Trois âges des Variétés, panorama dramatique in 1 act, in verses, mingled with couplets
1852: Un Homme de cinquante ans, comédie-vaudeville in 1 act
1852: Les Reines des bals publics, folie-vaudeville in 1 act, with Delaporte
1853: La Forêt de Sénart, drama in 3 acts
1853: Les Femmes du monde, comédie vaudeville in 5 acts, with Eugène Cormon and Eugène Grangé
1853: La Fille de Madame Grégoire, vaudeville in 1 act, with Delaporte
1854: Brelan de maris, comédie-vaudeville in 1 act, with Laurencin
1854: M. Bannelet, comédie-vaudeville in 1 act, with Charles Nuitter
1854: Où passerai-je mes soirées, comédie-vaudeville in 1 act, with Charles Potier
1856: Le Fils de la France, cantata
1862: A Pie IX (8 juin 1862), ode

Bibliography 
 Stéphane Vachon, 1850, tombeau d'Honoré de Balzac, 2007, (p. 95)

19th-century French dramatists and playwrights
19th-century French poets
Writers from Paris
1828 births
1867 deaths
Burials at Père Lachaise Cemetery